Clitoria falcata is a plant of the genus Clitoria native to South and Central America.

References

External links
 
 

falcata